Bradley Snetsinger (born April 8, 1987) is a Canadian professional ice hockey player who is currently playing for the Starbulls Rosenheim in the German Oberliga (ice hockey).

Career statistics

Regular season and playoffs

External links

Living people
Bakersfield Condors (1998–2015) players
Lowell Devils players
Mississauga IceDogs players
SHC Fassa players
Trenton Devils players
Utah Grizzlies (AHL) players
Windsor Spitfires players
1987 births
Canadian expatriate ice hockey players in Italy
Canadian ice hockey left wingers